The 2000 Heineken Trophy was a tennis tournament played on outdoor grass courts at Autotron park in Rosmalen, 's-Hertogenbosch, Netherlands that was part of the International Series of the 2000 ATP Tour and Tier III of the 2000 WTA Tour. The tournament was held from 19 June until 25 June 2000. Patrick Rafter and Martina Hingis won the singles titles.

Finals

Men's singles

 Patrick Rafter defeated  Nicolas Escudé 6–1, 6–3

Women's singles

 Martina Hingis defeated  Ruxandra Dragomir 6–2, 3–0 ret.
 It was Brandi's only singles title.

Men's doubles

 Martin Damm /  Cyril Suk defeated  Paul Haarhuis /  Sandon Stolle 6–4, 6–7(5–7), 7–6(7–5)

Women's doubles

 Erika deLone /  Nicole Pratt defeated  Catherine Barclay /  Karina Habšudová, 7–6(8–6), 4–3 ret.

External links
 

Heineken Trophy
Rosmalen Grass Court Championships
2000 in Dutch tennis